Barry Took (19 June 192831 March 2002) was an English writer, television presenter and comedian. His decade-and-a-half writing partnership with Marty Feldman led to the television series Bootsie and Snudge, the radio comedy Round the Horne and other projects.

He is also remembered in the UK for presenting Points of View, a BBC Television programme featuring viewers' letters on the BBC's output, and the BBC Radio 4 programme The News Quiz.

Early life and education
The son of a manager at the Danish Bacon Company, Took was born in Victoria Road, Muswell Hill, north London, and lived in Winton Avenue, Bounds Green. When evacuated to Wisbech in Cambridgeshire during the Second World War, he ran away from his assigned home there, cycling 20 miles to Peterborough in order to get a train back to London. He attended Stationers School but left at the age of 15. His elder brother Philip would eventually work for the US Space Program before dying as a young man.

Career
With his limited education, Took found work as an office boy for a publisher and a cinema projectionist. During his period of National Service in the Royal Air Force, in which he played the trumpet, he began performing and later worked as a stand-up comedian, eventually becoming a West End revue performer, working on For Amusement Only and For Adults Only.

In terms of his comedy writing, Took's best work was written in collaboration with Marty Feldman, whom he first met in 1954. The two men wrote for several television shows in the 1950s and '60s, including The Army Game and its spin-off Bootsie and Snudge. He co-wrote Beyond Our Ken for two series (1958–59) with Eric Merriman for BBC Radio before leaving after a disagreement with his fellow writer. With Marty Feldman he wrote most episodes of Round the Horne; the intermittent partnership between them continued until 1974.

In the late 1960s Took became comedy advisor to the BBC, and was responsible for bringing together the performers who formed Monty Python's Flying Circus before he moved to the US to work briefly on Rowan and Martin's Laugh In. He returned to the UK in early 1970 and was involved in setting up the BBC series The Goodies, although he had returned to take up the position of Head of Light Entertainment at London Weekend Television. He resigned from this position when Stella Richman, his superior and the Director of Programming, was dismissed. On the Move (1975–76), a programme linked to a national campaign to promote adult literacy, was written by Took and featured Bob Hoskins and Donald Gee. He was involved in two further television series on the issue, Your Move and Write Away.

In 1977 Took hosted his own comedy sketch show, Took and Co. Also featuring Robin Bailey, Chris Emmett, Andrew Sachs and Gwen Taylor, the series ran for seven episodes late at night on ITV.

In 1979 he became chairman of The News Quiz on BBC Radio 4, a role he filled until 1981 and again from 1986 to 1995. In the same year he became a presenter of Points of View, staying with the programme for 7½ years.

Took also hosted the BBC Radio 2 comedy panel game The Impressionists, which included Peter Goodwright, Roger Kitter, David Jason and Dave Evans and, in 1998, the single-series revival of Twenty Questions titled Guess What?.

He had seven books published, including his autobiography and several histories of comedy. He also wrote Kenneth Williams's life story for the Oxford Dictionary of National Biography in 1996.

Personal life and final years
During his time with the Royal Air Force he met his first wife, Dorothy "Dot" Bird, who was serving in the Women's Royal Air Force. They married in 1950 and had three children (Barry, Susan and David), but were later divorced. In 1964 he married Lynden "Lyn" Leonard, this second marriage resulting in a daughter named Elinor. The couple separated in 1999 and eventually divorced. He also spoke publicly about his experiences with depression and undergoing extensive psychotherapy for several years.

After suffering from bladder cancer during the 1970s, in 1999 he was diagnosed with cancer of the oesophagus, and suffered a stroke four weeks after undergoing major surgery. He died on Easter Sunday 2002, aged 73, in a nursing home in Enfield.

Autobiography
A Point of View (1990)

References

External links
 
 
Barry Took – Comedy Zone
BBC News article reporting his death

1928 births
2002 deaths
20th-century English comedians
20th-century Royal Air Force personnel
Deaths from cancer in England
Deaths from esophageal cancer
English male comedians
English radio personalities
English radio writers
English television personalities
People educated at the Stationers' Company's School
People from Muswell Hill
People from Wisbech
People from Wood Green